Mount Willoughby may refer to:
Mount Willoughby Indigenous Protected Area
Mount Willoughby, South Australia, locality partially coincident with the Indigenous Protected Area